The Ceres Microregion is located in north-central Goiás state, Brazil.  It includes 22 cities with a total population of 215,820 inhabitants (2007).  The total area is 13,224.40 km2.  The most important cities are Ceres and Goianésia.

The most populous municipality is Goianésia with 53,806 inhabitants.  The least populous is São Patrício with 2,051 inhabitants.

The largest municipality in land area is Goianésia with 1,419.0 km2.  The smallest is São Patrício with 135.0 km2.

Municipalities 
The microregion consists of the following municipalities:
Barro Alto 6,446
Carmo do Rio Verde 8,897
Ceres 18,637 
Goianésia 53,806 
Guaraíta 2,394
Guarinos 2,411
Hidrolina 4,157
Ipiranga de Goiás 2,813
Itapaci 16,003
Itapuranga 24,832
Morro Agudo de Goiás 2,339
Nova América 2,200
Nova Glória 8,470
Pilar de Goiás 2,852
Rialma 10,485
Rianápolis 4,167
Rubiataba 18,025
Santa Isabel 3,485
Santa Rita do Novo Destino 3,372
São Luís do Norte 4,266
São Patrício 2,051
Uruana 13,712

Population is from 2007.

See also 
List of municipalities in Goiás
Microregions of Goiás

References

Microregions of Goiás